I Missed Us is the fifth studio album by American R&B group SWV. It was released by Mass Appeal Entertainment and eOne Music on April 17, 2012. The album marked the trio's first studio album since their disbandment in 1997. Cainon Lamb worked with them on the majority of the record, while additional production was helmed by Carvin & Ivan, Michael "Big Mike" Clemons, and Bryan-Michael Cox. I Missed Us was preceded by three singles, including lead single "Co-Sign." It also includes their remake of the Patti LaBelle classic, "If Only You Knew" which earned SWV a Grammy Award nomination in the Best Traditional R&B Performance category.

Background
I Missed Us is SWV's first album release in over a decade, following 1997's A Special Christmas and their disbandment the following year "amid plenty of dissension, to pursue individual projects and focus on their families". Michael J. Feeney of NY Daily News wrote the "road to recording “I Missed Us” wasn’t easy". Whilst discussing the break-up, group member Leanne Lyons said; “there were times we weren’t speaking” because "we allowed people to tear us apart". In addition to this, she explained; "we tried to do our own thing individually, then we realized we’re much stronger together" and that they "had to go through a transition of maturity".

After a failed reunion for a comeback album, the group reunited for a few performances, notably the 2008 BET Awards before commencing work on the album in 2011. Clemons said "it felt really good to be recording with my sisters again" and that "the title of the album, ‘I Missed Us’ says it all. We missed the fans, but we also really missed each other”. Lyons said, "we wanted to bring love back. We wanted to take people through the process of love,”. She described the album as having a “youthful feel, but very damn grown.”

Critical reception

Allmusic editor Andy Kellman called I Missed Us "one of the best comeback albums of the last decade" and wrote that the album "doesn't sound like the work of a group that went 15 years without releasing a studio album [...] Lamb wrote and produced the album's first nine songs; he seems to have approached the women as if they don't have a history and have no expectations beyond delivering a high-quality 2012 R&B album [...] In fact, the only aspect that resembles the past is the women's voices [...] The four songs with other collaborators almost seem like bonus tracks, given the strength of the 34-minute Lamb portion, but they don't sound all that out of place." Entertainment Weeklys Mikael Wood felt that the "R&B hitmakers’ first album in 15 years probably won’t return them to the top of the charts [...] but ’90s-style cuts ”All About You” and the Chaka Khan-sampling ”Do Ya” still get us weak in the knees."

Commercial performance
I Missed Us debuted at number twenty-five on the US Billboard 200 and number six on the Billboard Top R&B/Hip-Hop Albums chart with first week sales of 14,000 units. As of 2013, it has sold 61,000 units.

Track listing

Personnel
 Drums and programming: Cainon Lamb, Bryan-Michael Cox, Ivan "Orthodox" Barias, Michael "Big Mike" Clemons
 Keyboards: Cainon Lamb, Bryan-Michael Cox, Ivan "Orthodox" Barias, Raymond Gorden, Taurian "TJ" Osborn, Arthur "Buddy" Strong, Leonard Stephens, Anthony Randolph
 Bass: Tadarius McCombs, Taurian "TJ" Osborn, Nathan Clemons
 Guitar: Anthony Randolph, Kendall Gilder 
 Background vocals: SWV, Kevin Ross, Jean Baylor, Allen Irvin
 Recording engineer: Andrew Thielk, Miguel Castro, Richard Reale, Sam Thomas, Bryan-Michael Cox, Carvin Haggins, Ivan Barias, Loren Barton
 Mixing: James Zaner, Marcus "DL" Siskind, Jason Goldstein, Ken Lewis, Sam Thomas, Bryan-Michael Cox, Loren Barton
 Mastering: Tony Dawsey
 Photography: Derek Blanks
 Art direction & design: Sean Marlowe

Charts

Weekly charts

Year-end charts

References

2012 albums
SWV albums
E1 Music albums